Cláudio César de Aguiar Mauriz (22 August 1940 – 24 July 1979), known simply as Cláudio, was a Brazilian international footballer who played as a goalkeeper.

Honours
Santos
Intercontinental Supercup: 1968
Recopa Sudamericana: 1968
Taça Brasil: 1965
Torneio Rio – São Paulo: 1966 (split)
Campeonato Paulista: 1967, 1968, 1969, 1973 (split)

References

External links
 

1940 births
1979 deaths
Deaths from cancer in New York (state)
Footballers from Rio de Janeiro (city)
Brazilian footballers
Association football goalkeepers
Fluminense FC players
Olaria Atlético Clube players
Bonsucesso Futebol Clube players
Santos FC players
Campeonato Brasileiro Série A players
Campeonato Brasileiro Série B players
Brazil international footballers